Cassipourea subcordata is a species of plant in the Rhizophoraceae family. It is endemic to Jamaica.

References

subcordata
Critically endangered plants
Endemic flora of Jamaica
Taxonomy articles created by Polbot